Chionothrix is a genus of plants in the amaranth family, Amaranthaceae and is found in Africa distributed in north-east tropical Africa.

The genus has 2 accepted species:

 Chionothrix latifolia Rendle
 Chionothrix somalensis (S.Moore) Hook.fil.

References

Flora of Northeast Tropical Africa
 
Amaranthaceae genera
Taxa named by Joseph Dalton Hooker